The Plainfield Public School District is a comprehensive community public school district that serves students in kindergarten through twelfth grade from Plainfield, in Union County, New Jersey, United States. The district is one of 31 former Abbott districts statewide that were established pursuant to the decision by the New Jersey Supreme Court in Abbott v. Burke which are now referred to as "SDA Districts" based on the requirement for the state to cover all costs for school building and renovation projects in these districts under the supervision of the New Jersey Schools Development Authority.

As of the 2018–19 school year, the district, comprising 13 schools, had an enrollment of 9,363 students and 615.4 classroom teachers (on an FTE basis), for a student–teacher ratio of 15.2:1.

The district is classified by the New Jersey Department of Education as being in District Factor Group "B", the second lowest of eight groupings. District Factor Groups organize districts statewide to allow comparison by common socioeconomic characteristics of the local districts. From lowest socioeconomic status to highest, the categories are A, B, CD, DE, FG, GH, I and J.

Schools
Schools in the district (with 2018–19 enrollment data from the National Center for Education Statistics) are:

Elementary schools
DeWitt D. Barlow Elementary School (373 students; in grades K-5)
Wilson Aponte, Principal
Cedarbrook Elementary School (699; K-8)
Dr. Frank Asante, Principal
Clinton Elementary School (380; K-5)
Dr. Janet Grooms, Principal
Frederic W. Cook Elementary School (367; K-5)
Dr. Caryn Cooper, Principal
Emerson Elementary School (459; K-5)
Dion Roach, Principal
Evergreen Elementary School (531; K-5)
Miguelina Landisi, Principal
Jefferson Elementary School (419; K-5)
Telaya Parham, Principal
Charles H. Stillman Elementary School (311; K-5)
Gwynetta Y. Joe, Principal
Washington Community School (576; K-5)
Dr. Anthony Jenkins, Principal
Middle schools
Hubbard Middle School (715; 6-8)
Olivia Rodríguez-Calderon, Principal
Maxson Middle School (726; 6-8)
Lisa Armstead, Principal
High schools / academies
Plainfield Academy for the Arts and Advanced Studies (396; 7-12)
Gregory Sneed, Principal
Plainfield High School (741; 9-12)
Kevin Stansbury, Principal

In August 2017, the district received approval from the New Jersey Schools Development Authority to construct a new elementary school that will replace the Cook and Woodland Avenue schools, which will both be demolished when the new school is completed. The new facility, which would accommodate 750 students in grades K-5, is expected to be completed in 2022 at a cost of $57 million.

Administration
Core members of the district's administration are:
Rashon K. Hasan, Acting Superintendent of Schools
Rashon K. Hasan, Business Administrator / Board Secretary

Board of education
The district's board of education, comprised of nine members, sets policy and oversees the fiscal and educational operation of the district through its administration. As a Type II school district, the board's trustees are elected directly by voters to serve three-year terms of office on a staggered basis, with three seats up for election each year held (since 2017) as part of the November general election. The board appoints a superintendent to oversee the district's day-to-day operations and a business administrator to supervise the business functions of the district.

References

External links

School Data for the Plainfield Public School District, National Center for Education Statistics

Public School District
New Jersey Abbott Districts
New Jersey District Factor Group B
School districts in Union County, New Jersey